is a Japanese actor.

Career
Tsuda appeared in Kiyoshi Kurosawa's Tokyo Sonata. He co-starred in Sion Sono's Guilty of Romance with Megumi Kagurazaka.

Filmography

Film
 Sonatine (1993)
 119 (1994)
 Kids Return (1996)
 Hana-bi (1997)
 Bayside Shakedown: The Movie (1998)
 April Story (1998) – Fukatsu
 Audition (1999) – Bartender
 Shark Skin Man and Peach Hip Girl (1999) – Fukazume
 Himawari (2000)
 Party 7 (2000) – Desk Clerk
 Monday (2000)
 Love Song (2001)
 Go (2001) – Henchman of Kato's father
 Distance (2001)
 Desert Moon (2001) – Masaru's elder brother
 Drive (2002)
 August Illusion (2002)
 Mohou-han (2002)
 Kamen Rider Ryuki: Episode Final (2002) – Daisuke Okubo
 When the Last Sword Is Drawn (2003)
 Ju-on: The Grudge (2003) – Katsuya Tokunaga
 Kamen Rider 555: Paradise Lost (2003) – Mina's Father
 Dolls (2002) – Young Hiro
 Last Love, First Love (2003)
 Socrates in Love (2004) – Johnny
 Kiss and Kizu (2004)
 Love Kill Kill (2004)
 Survive Style 5+ (2004)
 The Sea of Trees (2004)
 Curtain Call (2004)
 Strawberry Field (2004)
 Cromartie High – The Movie (2005) – Interviewer A
 Funky Forest (2005)
 The Great Yokai War (2005)
 Kamen Rider: The First (2005) – Bat
 Water Flower (2006) – Takashi Nagahara
 The Pavilion Salamandre (2006)
 Gamera the Brave (2006) – Kousuke Aizawa
 Waiting in the Dark (2006)
 Sakuran (2007)
 Itsuka no Kimi e (2007)
 My Darling of the Mountains (2008)
 Tokyo Sonata (2008) – Kurosu
 Vampire Girl vs. Frankenstein Girl (2009)
 Blood (2009) – Detective Hoshino
 Kyō Kara Hitman (2009) – Round Glasses
 Surely Someday (2010)
 Heaven's Story (2010)
 Mutant Girls Squad (2010) – Rin's father
 Garo: Red Requiem (2010) – Kengi
 A Good Husband (2010)
 Smuggler (2011)
 Guilty of Romance (2011)
 Life Back Then (2011)
 Dead Sushi (2012)
 The Carol of the Old Ones (2012)
 Flower and Snake: Zero (2014) – Toyama
 Shin Godzilla (2016) – Fumiya Mori
 Tantei wa, Konya mo Yuuutsuna Yume wo Miru (2017)
 Smokin' on the Moon (2018)
 Recall (2018) – Jōji Hamanaka
 Koi no Shizuku (2018)
 The Name (2018) – Masao
 Genin: Blue Shadow (2019) – Katsu Kaishū
 Genin: Red Shadow (2019) – Katsu Kaishū
 The Dignified Death of Shizuo Yamanaka (2020) – Dr. Imai
 13gatsu no Onnanoko (2020)
 Hokusai (2021)
 The Supporting Actors: The Movie (2021) – Himself
 Nishinari Goro's 400 Million Yen (2021)
 Pretenders (2021)
 Onoda: 10,000 Nights in the Jungle (2021) – Middle-Aged Hiroo Onoda
 Death in Tokyo (2021) - Namekata
 Niwatori Phoenix (2022)
 Akira and Akira (2022)
 Roleless (2022)
 Hand (2022)
 Kono Chiisana Te (2023)
 Side by Side (2023)
 Old Narcissus (2023)
 Oshorin (TBA)

Television
 Mike Yokohama: A Forest with No Name (2002)
 Kamen Rider Ryuki (2002) – Daisuke Okubo 
 Dr. Coto's Clinic (2003)
 K-tai Investigator 7 (2008)
 Michiko & Hatchin (2008) – Hiroshi Morenos
 Samurai Sentai Shinkenger (2009) – Takeru's father
 Mori no Asagao (2010)
 Garo: Yami o Terasu Mono (2013) – Tousei Kaneshiro
 Yamishibai: Japanese Ghost Stories (2013)
 Hana Moyu (2015) – Matsushima Gōzō
 Segodon (2018) – Matsudaira Shungaku
 Kamen Rider Zi-O (2019) – Daisuke Okubo
 Reach Beyond the Blue Sky (2021) - Takeda Kōunsai
 The Supporting Actors 3 (2021) - Himself

Dubbing roles

Animation
 Finding Nemo (2003) - Gurge
 Finding Dory (2016) - Gurge

Awards
 2002: 45th Blue Ribbon Awards – Supporting Actor (Mohou-han)

References

External links
 
 

1965 births
Living people
Japanese male film actors
Japanese male television actors
People from Fukui (city)
Actors from Fukui Prefecture
20th-century Japanese male actors
21st-century Japanese male actors